The 45th Wisconsin Infantry Regiment was a volunteer infantry regiment that served in the Union Army during the American Civil War.

Service
The 45th Wisconsin was organized at Madison, Wisconsin, and mustered into Federal service on November 8, 1864. It was assigned to the garrison of Nashville, Tennessee, for its entire service.

The regiment was mustered out on July 17, 1865.

Casualties
The 45th Wisconsin suffered 34 enlisted men who died of disease, for a total of 34 fatalities.

Commanders
 Colonel Henry F. Belitz

Notable people
 John B. Abert, son of George Abert, was a musician in Co. I.  After the war he became a deputy sheriff and city councilmember in Milwaukee.
 Peter Philipps was drafted and served as a sergeant in Co. B.   After the war he became a Wisconsin state legislator.
 Peter Reuther was drafted and served as first sergeant in Co. B.  After the war he became a Wisconsin state legislator.
 Bernard Schlichting was captain of Co. C after briefly serving as first lieutenant of Co. G.  Earlier in the war, he was enlisted in Co. G of the 9th Michigan Infantry Regiment.  After the war he became a Wisconsin state legislator.
 Reinhard Schlichting was captain of Co. A.  Earlier in the war, he was a second lieutenant in Co. K of the 9th Wisconsin Infantry Regiment.  After the war he became a Wisconsin state legislator, district attorney, and mayor of Chilton, Wisconsin.

See also

 List of Wisconsin Civil War units
 Wisconsin in the American Civil War

References
The Civil War Archive

Military units and formations established in 1864
Military units and formations disestablished in 1865
Units and formations of the Union Army from Wisconsin
1864 establishments in Wisconsin